ADA S.A., operating as Aerolínea de Antioquia (ADA), was a regional airline headquartered at the Olaya Herrera Airport in Medellín, Colombia. It started operations in 1987. It ceased all operations on March 29, 2019. At its peak, the airline operated scheduled domestic services from Medellín to over 20 destinations. Its main base was in Olaya Herrera Airport.

History

The beginning of operations of Aerolínea de Antioquia dates back to 1987, when it was established for the executive charter service. In 1998, it began its transformation process by connecting Medellín with regional destinations.

At the start of its regular operation, ADA had 4 Twin Otter type aircraft that had been operated by ACES, and only covered short routes within the department of Antioquia. In March 2002, it acquired a Twin Otter fleet from ACES Colombia. It contracted with that company for the training of its crews and maintenance of its aircraft; ACES in turn contracted with ADA for the operation of some of its regional routes such as Caucasia, Puerto Berrío and Armenia until it ceased operations in 2003.

In 2003, ADA became a commercial air service company of the Regular Public Transport, in their Secondary Category. This new stage allowed the airline to access new routes. ADA transported players from Atlético Nacional to the Copa Libertadores and journalists to the World Cup in Brazil in 2014.

In 2006, ADA further consolidated its corporate social responsibility policy with the "Making the dream of flying come true" program. With it, hundreds of passengers from different municipalities of the country could travel by plane for the first time in their lives and enjoy a flight over their regions of origin. In 2012, ADA strengthened its services by adding the Dornier 328 to their fleet. In March 2019, ADA suspended its operations, due to financial losses of more than 400 million pesos.

Destinations
Aerolínea de Antioquia served the following destinations (as of March 2019):

Fleet

Final fleet

The Aerolínea de Antioquia fleet included the following aircraft (as of March 2019):

Former fleet
The airline previously operated the following aircraft:

 British Aerospace Jetstream 32
 Cessna 303
 de Havilland Canada DHC-6 Twin Otter

See also
 List of defunct airlines of Colombia

References

External links
 
  

Defunct airlines of Colombia
Airlines established in 1987
Airlines disestablished in 2019